Within military 8 mm firearms, the Repeating Rifle Mannlicher 1888, better known as the Mannlicher M1888, was a bolt-action rifle used by several armies from 1888 to 1945. Derived from the M1885 and later M1886 models, it was Ferdinand Mannlicher's third rifle that utilized the "en bloc clip".

It was succeeded by the Mannlicher M1895 as the standard service rifle of the Austro-Hungarian Army. The M95 uses a more secure rotating-bolt, in contrast to the M88's wedge-lock bolt.

History 

The M1888 was a direct and immediate descendant of the M1886 Austrian Mannlicher. This rifle too was a straight-pull, bolt-action, box magazine repeater. As early as the beginning of production of the M1886 the need and desirability for a small-bore rifle was evident. This rifle is virtually identical to its predecessor but for chambering a newly designed 8 mm cartridge, loaded originally with black powder and denominated 8×52mmR.

M1888-90 rifle
Shortly thereafter, the M88 cartridge was converted to semi-smokeless powder. The new cartridge was designated 8mm M.1890 scharfe Patrone and its dimensions were 8×50mmR. The sights of existing black powder 8mm Mannlicher rifles were converted to accommodate semi-smokeless ammunition by the functional arrangement of screw mounting re-graduated sideplates onto the outsides of the existing rear sight walls. The converted rifles were denominated M.88–90.

M1890 rifle

When in 1890 semi-smokeless powder became available, manufacture of rifles with a longer and thus stronger chamber and modified sights began. Although the smokeless powder filled M.93 8×50mmR cartridge can be used in this rifle, the generated pressure at 40,000 psi (275.8 MPa) is marginal, as the wedge-lock bolt system this rifle uses was originally designed to be shot with less-potent black powder filled with 11×58mmR ammunition.

Kuaili 1888 Kiangnan Rifle 7.62x55 
China also used this rifle extensively during the Qing dynasty and the Republican era. China first bought Mannlicher 88 rifles before the First Sino-Japanese War in 1894–1895 and after that started production of the unlicensed Kuaili 1888 Kiangnan copy.

Users 

 First Austrian Republic
 Boers

: Both sides during the Federalist Revolution.
 Republic of China (1912–28)

 Sudeten German Party

: Some M88/90s would be cut-down to carbine length. These are functionally identical to standard M88/90s. 
: Used by Volkssturm.
: Captured from Bulgaria during the Second Balkan War and at the end of World War I.
    Haganah

 Kingdom of Romania: Before Second Balkan War Romania bought circa 60.000 Mannlicher M.90 and M.95. During World War I a number of M.88-90 and M.90 Mannlichers were captured from Bulgarian and Austria-Hungarian forces. Others were provided as reparations after the war. They were still in use during World War II

 Soviet Russia

 Kingdom of Siam : According to Steyr sales records, 15,000 M1888 rifles were furnished to Siam, most in the 1890s. Some may have been used items, sold from Austrian military stocks.

 Second Spanish Republic
 : Captured in Ethiopia, used by African or Indian troops in Garrison/Guard duties in Abyssinia in the 1941-42 period, and then ended up (along with all the rest of the captured Equipment) in India, the more modern rifles (M95s and Carcanos) and MGs, going to front line training ( Burma Front) and the rest (like M88) to straight training units and guard duty in the boonies of India.

References

 

8 mm firearms
Straight-pull rifles
Rifles of Austria
World War I Austro-Hungarian infantry weapons
Mannlicher rifles
Firearms by Ferdinand Mannlicher
1888 introductions

pl:Karabiny Mannlicher M1886, M1888, M1890